Chatin Singh Samaon is an Indian politician. He was a Member of Parliament, representing Bathinda, Punjab in the Lok Sabha the lower house of India's Parliament as a member of the Akali Dal.

References

External links
Official biographical sketch in Lok Sabha website

Living people
1942 births
Lok Sabha members from Punjab, India
India MPs 1998–1999
Shiromani Akali Dal politicians